Donald Bertsom Latimer (born March 1, 1955) is a former nose tackle for the Denver Broncos of the National Football League (NFL) in the late 1970s and early 1980s.

Latimer was born and raised in Fort Pierce, Florida. He played high school football at Fort Pierce Central High School. Latimer attended the University of Miami, where he played football as a defensive lineman in the mid-1970s.

Latimer was picked in the first round (27th overall) in the 1978 NFL Draft by the Denver Broncos, where he played six seasons. In 1983, he signed a contract with the Jacksonville Bulls, franchise of the United States Football League (USFL).

His son, Zach Latimer, was a linebacker for the University of Oklahoma.

References
"Bronco Lineman Jumps", The New York Times, July 24, 1983

1955 births
Living people
People from Fort Pierce, Florida
Players of American football from Florida
American football defensive tackles
Miami Hurricanes football players
Denver Broncos players
Jacksonville Bulls players